The 1904 Delaware football team represented Delaware College—now known as the University of Delaware–as an independent during the 1904 college football season. Led by second-year head coach Nathan Mannakee, Delaware compiled a record of 1–5–1.

Schedule

References

Delaware
Delaware Fightin' Blue Hens football seasons
Delaware football